Gaba landing site is found on Lake Victoria, in Ggaba, Kampala Uganda. It is used as a centre for fish trade in Uganda.

Developments
Ggaba landing site is on the shores of lake victoria. It is in Kampala. It is frequented by people who go to Ggaba beach which neighbours it. The site has a market where fish and foodstuffs are sold. it also has storage units, a trading point for fish, and offices for Kampala Capital City authority, which supervises the activities on the site.

Fishing activities

Fishermen set off from the site and return with fish to sell. The fish mostly caught in the waters near the site include: Nile perch, Tilapia, Lung fish and Cat fish. Fishing is mostly done in the middle of the lake, a little distance from the site. It is tilapia that is fished near the shore. Fishing has changed at the site over the years, from using small canoes to using motorized boats. The mode of transportation of fish has also evolved. The fish are moved in containers with ice, unlike before when they were simply dropped inside a boat and then delivered.

See also
 Fishing in Uganda
 Fishing sites and Villages/communities in Uganda
 Types of fish in Uganda

References

External links
"Uganda: Egypt Donates Shs219m for Upgrading Ggaba Landing Site"
"Darlyn Komukama photography"
"Ggaba suffocating Lake Victoria"

Ggaba
Water in Uganda
Kumusha